Keira Lucchesi is a Scottish actress.

Life and career
Keira Lucchesi's first professional role began in 2009, playing the role of Stella Walker in the BBC soap opera River City. Over the year, the shows story lines have seen the character go through a traumatic roller coaster of events including homelessness, a miscarriage and a recurring battle with alcoholism. In 2010, in recognition of her outstanding performance as Stella Walker, Lucchesi was nominated for Best Acting Performance at the 2010 British Academy Scotland New Talent Awards, and won a Young Scot Award in the Entertainment category in 2015.

In 2015, she starred in a revival of John Byrne's classic play The Slab Boys which was co directed by her boyfriend David Hayman Jr.

Filmography

Awards and nominations

References

External links

Living people
20th-century Scottish actresses
21st-century Scottish actresses
Scottish television actresses
Scottish film actresses
Scottish stage actresses
Scottish soap opera actresses
Year of birth missing (living people)
Actresses from Glasgow